Tonka  is a town and commune of the Cercle of Goudam in the Tombouctou Region of Mali. The commune includes around 22 settlements. The commune lies to the north of the Niger River and includes Lake Oro, a seasonal lake that fills with water during the annual flood of the Niger River.

See also 
 List of cities in Mali

References

External links
. This document gives the area of the commune as 3,500 km2.

Communes of Tombouctou Region